Trachelyichthys decaradiatus is a species of driftwood catfish endemic to Guyana where it is found in the Rupununi River basin.  It grows to a length of 8.0 cm.

References 
 

Auchenipteridae
Fish described in 1974
Fish of South America
Taxa named by Gerlof Mees